Who's Who in Animal Land is a 1944 American short comedy film directed by Lou Lilly. In 1945, it won an Oscar for Best Short Subject (One-Reel) at the 17th Academy Awards.

Cast 
 Ken Carpenter - Narrator

References

External links 

1944 films
1944 comedy films
American black-and-white films
Paramount Pictures short films
American comedy short films
Live Action Short Film Academy Award winners
1940s American films